Upland is a city in San Bernardino County, California, United States on the border with neighboring Los Angeles County. The municipality is located at an elevation of 1,242 feet (379 m). As of the 2020 census, the city had a population of 79,040, up from 73,732 at the 2010 census and 68,393 at the 2000 census. It was incorporated on May 15, 1906, after previously being named North Ontario. Upland is located at the foot of the highest part of the San Gabriel Mountains. The suburb is part of the Inland Empire, a metropolitan area situated directly east of the Los Angeles metropolitan area.

History

Early history
Upland is located at the foot of the San Gabriel Mountains on an east–west trail that was used by the Native Americans and Spanish missionaries, part of what is now known as the Old Spanish Trail.  To the west, the trail led to the San Gabriel Mission, which Spanish Missionaries built in 1771.

In 1774, Spanish explorer Juan Bautista de Anza established an overland route from Arizona to California, with part of the trail passing through present day Upland on the way to the San Gabriel Mission. Anza's route went through Yuma, the San Gorgonio Pass and through the San Bernardino Valley. In 1775, Anza led a second expedition consisting of more than 240 people on a journey of over two thousand miles to the San Francisco Bay.  En route, the expedition reached the San Gabriel Mission on January 4, 1776. The expedition reached the San Francisco Bay on June 27, 1776, where Anza founded the present day city of San Francisco. Five years later, in 1781, Spanish settlers followed Anza's route to found the city of Los Angeles a few miles west of the San Gabriel Mission.

Following the Anza expedition, the San Gabriel Mission became an important stopping place for expeditions traveling between Arizona and California. The mission was the first place where supplies could be procured after crossing the desert, and as travel over this road increased, the mission arranged to establish a supply station at some intermediate point east. In 1810, a party of missionaries, soldiers, and Native Americans from San Gabriel mission, under the leadership of Padre Dumetz, were sent out to select a location. On the 20th of May, 1810, they came into the San Bernardino Valley. This, according to the Roman Catholic Calendar of Saints, was the feast day of Saint Bernardino of Siena, and they named the valley in his honor. The expedition named the area around Upland "Cucamonga," which in the Tongvan language meant "sand place."

Jedediah Smith of the Rocky Mountain Fur Company was the first American to enter California overland. He started from the Yellowstone River, August, 1826, with a party of fifteen men. Their course was down the Colorado River to the Mojave, where they found two Native Americans, who guided them across the desert to San Gabriel Mission. Smith pioneered the route over the Cajon Pass, where he then joined the foothill route established by Anza, arriving at San Gabriel on November 27. California was part of Mexico at the time, so Smith was briefly arrested by the Mexican governor before being released.

In 1829, Mexican explorer Antonio Armijo led the first successful caravan from Santa Fe to Southern California, joining up with Smith's route to open what would later be called the Old Spanish Trail. The route resulted in immediate commerce between Santa Fe and Los Angeles. Pack trains made annual treks between New Mexico and California, bringing woven Mexican products to California, which lacked sheep, and bartering them for horses and mules, scarce in New Mexico. The trail carried mule-trains over the Cajon Pass, then west through Rancho Cucamonga, Upland, and El Monte, to the region's major settlements at Mission San Gabriel and Los Angeles.

From the time of the Anza expedition until the Mexican Rancho Period, the land around Upland was used as grazing land by the San Gabriel Mission. Under mission rule, cattle ranching became a major industry. The rangy cattle thrived and bred rapidly in the benign climate, and thousands of cattle wandered across the Cucamonga Rancho. Following the secularization of the missions by the Mexican government, the Cucamonga Rancho was granted to Tiburcio Tapia in 1839. Upon the death of Tapia in 1845, the Rancho passed to his daughter and her husband, Leon V. Prudhomme. An 1886 report by the California Surveyor General listed the size of the Cucamonga Rancho as 13,045 acres.

Founding
California became part of the United States at the end of the Mexican–American War in 1846, and American settlers began to arrive in California in large numbers with the California Gold Rush of 1849. The Cucamonga Rancho changed hands several times, but the area that present-day Upland occupies was little more than an uninhabited ranchland and a place to pass through until the arrival of George Chaffey in 1882. Chaffey, a Canadian shipbuilder from the province of Ontario, had already established the Etiwanda irrigation community in 1881, irrigating the land with a series of flumes carried water from the mountains to a reservoir from which water would then be sent to the relative land sites. In 1882, Chaffey purchased 6,216 acres of land in the Cucamonga Rancho, along with significant water rights from San Antonio Creek, for $60,000 Additional purchases brought the size of the land to over 8,000 acres of land for a total purchase price of $90,000

Chaffey's master plan called for distributing the water over the whole tract to each farm lot in cement pipes, with each holder to share in the water proportionately to his holding irrespective of distance from the source. Chaffey also laid out the main thoroughfare which ran from one end of the settlement to the other. He also named the "main thoroughfare" Euclid in honor of his favorite mathematician. Euclid Avenue was seven miles long, stretching from the colony's "southernmost boundaries to the mountains." Euclid was planned as a "200-foot-wide double drive ... [with a] center parkway to be flanked by a 65-foot-wide drive on each side. Chaffey also planned for electricity in Ontario with street lamps being placed a mile apart on Euclid and an electric streetcar that would travel up and down Euclid daily. Ontario was available for settlement on November 1, 1882. During the first week, Chaffey sold 190 acres for a total value of $28,500.

To ensure the success of this irrigation plan and to appeal to potential land buyers, the Chaffey created a "mutual water company" in which each landowner became a stockholder. The San Antonio Water Company was incorporated on October 25, 1882.

The Ontario colony eventually became known for its citrus groves, but in 1882, orange trees were too scarce and expensive at $100 an acre to turn to citrus, so at first other types of fruit were planted. By 1884, Ontario Nursery owner D.A. Shaw reported that there were "40,000 peach trees, 29,000 pear trees, 15,000 seedling apple trees, 16,000 grafted apple trees, 1,000 cherry trees, and 16,000 grape cuttings set out in orchards and vineyards." However, by 1889, some 2,000 acres of citrus orchards had been planted on Ontario, and Ontario was rated as having the second largest citrus acreage in the state.

The present-day city of Upland was the originally northern part of Chaffee's Ontario Model Colony, and was known as "North Ontario" or "Magnolia" after a local hotel. The name Upland was first used as the name of the "Upland Citrus Association." Long-time resident Charles D. Adams, organizer and first elected president of the Association, was credited with choosing the name.  However, by 1902, the name "Upland" was used to refer to the entire area of North Ontario.

The railway came to North Ontario in 1887. When the Ontario Colony was founded, downtown was located next to the Southern Pacific tracks. In 1887 the Atchison, Topeka, and Santa Fe completed its connection adjacent to the newly founded Magnolia Tract in North Ontario. Subdividers of Magnolia, the Bedford Brothers, announced plans to erect a depot at the foot of Second Avenue, the primary business street. A notice in the December 1887 Ontario Record indicated that the cost of the station would be $7,000. In the next decades numerous packing houses were built close to the tracks on both sides of A Street. Used for commuting of residents and tourists as well as for freight, the railroad linked Upland to Los Angeles to the west and the rest of the Santa Fe network to the east.

Ontario officially incorporated in 1891, but the size of incorporation was relatively small; a half-square mile bordered by the “Southern Pacific tract to the south, G Street to the north, Sultana Avenue to the east and Vine Avenue to the west." In 1901, residents of Ontario learned that those living in North Ontario were also thinking of incorporation as their own city. In order to eliminate this possibility, the city expanded their half-square mile to over 10 square miles.

When Ontario started to push for a larger area of incorporation, Upland residents expressed concern. The area of land that Ontario wanted included the Upland Post Office, the tracks for the Atchison, Topeka and Santa Fe Railroad, and the train depot. On March 12, 1906, the San Bernardino Board of Supervisors conducted a two-day hearing and agreed that a vote for incorporation should take place. On May 5, 1906, Upland approved their vote for incorporation with 183 in favor and 19 against. The city was officially created on May 15, 1906, by the Secretary of State in Sacramento. In 1935, Upland's boundary lines were redrawn to include the land that was annexed in Ontario's 1902 expansion.

Later history
Upland's first hospital, the San Antonio Hospital, opened on the corner of Arrow Highway and San Antonio Avenue in 1907, one year after Upland was incorporated as a city. The hospital had 18 beds with a medical staff of five physicians. It was built with funds received from community stock sales. The expanded San Antonio Community Hospital was dedicated on Wednesday, July 30, 1924. This new hospital, "commodiously and scientifically constructed," according to a news article in the Upland News, had 35 rooms with a capacity for 50 patients. The total cost for this new facility, located on East San Bernardino Road, was $173,107.10.

In 1911, the citizens of Upland created a volunteer fire department with F.H. Manker named as the Fire Chief. The first recorded piece of apparatus was a hose cart that was pulled by the first available personnel. In 1913, the first serious fire to occur in the new community destroyed all the businesses on the east side of Second Avenue south of Ninth Street. This fire generated interest in further protecting the community, and in 1915 the fire station on D Street was built. The first motorized fire engine was purchased at this time. In 2017, the Upland Fire Department dissolved and became a part of the San Bernardino County fire district.

Upland was one of the cities located on the National Old Trails Road, established in 1912 as the first national coast-to-coast highway. In Upland, the national highway ran along Foothill Boulevard, which had been built on the route established by the early Spanish explorers. In 1926, a hundred years after Jedediah Smith's expedition, the western part of the National Old Trails Road became part of the famed Route 66.

A trolley line in the broad, tree-lined median of Euclid Avenue formerly connected Upland to the Southern Pacific Railroad line in Ontario. The trolley was pulled from Ontario to Upland by a mule, which then climbed aboard an attached trailer for the ride back down.
It was later converted to electricity and closed in 1928.

The citrus industry in Upland and neighboring Ontario continued to thrive, and by the 1930s, citrus had become the dominant agricultural crop for California. In 1936, the revenue from the citrus industry totaled $97,000,000. This was second in profit only to the California petroleum industry, which totaled $159,500,000. At the height of citrus production, the industry produced sixty percent of the nation's citrus supply and twenty percent of the world's supply. This success continued for citrus growers until the mid-1940s, when the citrus industry as a whole began its decline. After World War II, land values began to skyrocket, and growers began to sell their land to developers.

In 1954, the San Bernardino Freeway, later part of Interstate 10, was completed, connecting Los Angeles to San Bernardino. The freeway, one of the first in the nation, eased the commute to Los Angeles and accelerated the transition of Upland from a rural citrus area to a residential and commercial community.

Geography
Upland is located on the northern edge of the San Bernardino Valley.  The San Gabriel Mountains are to the north of Upland. The city terrain is fairly flat but slopes gradually upward to the north. From south to north, the city elevation increases by 825 feet over a distance of 4.25 miles, from 1,175 feet at the intersection of 7th Street and Euclid Avenue (southern city boundary) to an elevation of 2,000 ft at the intersection of 24th Street and Euclid Avenue (northern city boundary). The highest peak in the San Gabriels, Mount San Antonio, known locally as Mount Baldy, is approximately 9.5 miles north of the Upland's northern boundary and caps out at 10,064 feet.

Upland is bordered on the east by Rancho Cucamonga, to the south by Ontario and Montclair, to the west by Claremont, and to the north by the unincorporated community of San Antonio Heights.

Upland has semi-arid climate with most of the rainfall occurring during the winter months. The average annual rainfall is 24.5 inches. The highest recorded temperature was 113 °F in July 2006. The lowest recorded temperature was 21 °F in January 1963. According to the Köppen Climate Classification system, Upland has a warm-summer Mediterranean climate, abbreviated "Csb" on climate maps.

Demographics

2020
The 2020 United States Census reported that Upland had a population of 79,040. The racial makeup of Upland was 60.6% White (36.8% Non-Hispanic White), 6.5% African American, 0.9% Native American, 8.9% Asian, 0.2% Pacific Islander, and 9.6% from two or more races. Hispanic or Latino of any race were 44.1%.

There were 26,654 households, averaging 2.88 people, with 30.6% of people over the age of five living in a home where a language other then English is spoken. While 90.1% of households had a broadband Internet subscription, 94.7% of households had a computer. Of people over 1 year old, 86.5% lived in the same home a year previously.

The census reported 5.8% of the population was under the age of 5 and 21.8% under the age of 18. People 65 years of age or older made up 14.9% of the population. The population was 51.9% female and included 3,356 veterans. People born outside the United States made up 17.6% of the population.

Of the housing units, 54.6% were owner-occupied. Median rent was $1,571.

Upland had a median household income of $76,259, with a per capita income of $35,624 annually and 11.3% of the population living below the federal poverty line.

Among the population age 16+ years old, 66.3% were in the civilian labor force. Workers in this demographic reported a mean time to work of 31.1 minutes.

2010
The 2010 United States Census reported that Upland had a population of 73,732. The racial makeup of Upland was 48,364 (65.6%) White (44.2% Non-Hispanic White), 5,400 (7.3%) African American, 522 (0.7%) Native American, 6,217 (8.4%) Asian, 159 (0.2%) Pacific Islander, 9,509 (12.9%) from other races, and 3,561 (4.8%) from two or more races. Hispanic or Latino of any race were 28,035 persons (38.0%).

The Census reported that 73,050 people (99.1% of the population) lived in households, 305 (0.4%) lived in non-institutionalized group quarters, and 377 (0.5%) were institutionalized.

There were 25,823 households, out of which 9,770 (37.8%) had children under the age of 18 living in them, 13,400 (51.9%) were opposite-sex married couples living together, 4,026 (15.6%) had a female householder with no husband present, 1,557 (6.0%) had a male householder with no wife present. There were 1,533 (5.9%) unmarried opposite-sex partnerships, and 219 (0.8%) same-sex married couples or partnerships. 5,159 households (20.0%) were made up of individuals, and 1,786 (6.9%) had someone living alone who was 65 years of age or older. The average household size was 2.83. There were 18,983 families (73.5% of all households); the average family size was 3.26.

The population was spread out, with 18,091 people (24.5%) under the age of 18, 7,504 people (10.2%) aged 18 to 24, 19,917 people (27.0%) aged 25 to 44, 19,322 people (26.2%) aged 45 to 64, and 8,898 people (12.1%) who were 65 years of age or older. The median age was 36.1 years. For every 100 females, there were 93.1 males. For every 100 females age 18 and over, there were 89.9 males.

The homeowner vacancy rate was 1.6%; the rental vacancy rate was 8.3%. 42,560 people (57.7% of the population) lived in owner-occupied housing units and 30,490 people (41.4%) lived in rental housing units.

During 2009–2013, Upland had a median household income of $62,667, with 13.5% of the population living below the federal poverty line.

2000
As of the census of 2000, there were 68,393 people, 24,551 households, and 17,873 families residing in the city. The population density was 4,523.9 inhabitants per square mile (1,746.5/km2). The racial makeup of the city was 67.2% White, 7.6% African American, 0.8% Native American, 7.3% Asian, 0.2% Pacific Islander, 12.3% from other races, and 4.7% from two or more races. Hispanic or Latino of any race were 27.5% of the population.

There were 24,551 households, out of which 36.3% had children under the age of 18 living with them, 53.2% were married couples living together, 14.3% had a female householder with no husband present, and 27.2% were non-families. 21.1% of all households were made up of individuals, and 7.0% had someone living alone who was 65 years of age or older. The average household size was 2.8 and the average family size was 3.2.

In the city, the population was spread out, with 27.3% under the age of 18, 9.6% from 18 to 24, 29.2% from 25 to 44, 23.1% from 45 to 64, and 10.8% who were 65 years of age or older. The median age was 34 years. For every 100 females, there were 92.5 males. For every 100 females age 18 and over, there were 88.7 males.

The median income for a household in the city was $48,734, and the median income for a family was $57,471. Males had a median income of $43,485 versus $29,973 for females. The per capita income for the city was $23,343. About 9.1% of families and 12.0% of the population were below the poverty line, including 15.4% of those under age 18 and 6.4% of those age 65 or over.

Economy

Top employers
According to the city's 2019 Comprehensive Annual Financial Report, the top employers in the city are:

Arts and culture

Museums
Upland Fire Department Museum. The museum is housed in the first fire station in the city. The museum houses fire fighting equipment and photographs. The station building dates back to 1915. The museum houses the original Upland fire truck from 1916.

Cooper Regional History Museum. The former headquarters of the Ontario-Cucamonga (O.K.) Fruit Exchange is a 1937 Art Moderne style building on the corner of Second Avenue and "A" Street, in Upland. The largest room is dedicated to the wine and citrus history of the area, with a smaller room with Native American photos and tools, and a hallway bursting with photographs and antique furniture.

Inland Empire Museum of Art (IEMA) was founded 2015 in as a nonprofit art museum located in Upland, California. The museum relies on donations and public support.

Festivals
The Upland Lemon Festival began in 1997 and is celebrated annually in April. The festival celebrates the city's citrus industry and includes the Lemon Idol vocal contest, food competitions, and carnival rides. The festival is held in downtown Upland.

Skateboarding
Upland is known in Southern California skateboard culture as a spot for vertical skateboarding. Several famous skateboarders have visited the city, known as "Badlands" in skateboarding culture due to its geographical location. On Saturday May 19, 2012, Mayor Ray Musser acknowledged local Stan Hoffman, the owner of the now defunct Pipeline Skatepark, by giving him a lifetime achievement for his contribution to the skate culture.

Points of interest

Madonna of the Trail
In 1929, the Daughters of the American Revolution placed a Madonna of the Trail statue in Upland at the intersection of Foothill Boulevard and Euclid Avenue. The twelve Madonna of the Trail statues, created by sculptor August Leimbach, mark the route of the National Old Trails road with the westernmost statue being that in Upland. One of the inscriptions on the base of the Madonna of the Trail statue notes that, in 1826, Jedediah Smith passed through what later became Upland, leading a band of 16 trappers in an expedition that marked the first American entry into California over land.

Historic Route 66
While Route 66 was disestablished in 1985, remnants of the classic highway can still be seen today on Foothill Boulevard in Upland, including a "classic" McDonald's with the original golden arches and the vintage Buffalo Inn, where buffalo burgers have been served since 1929.

Euclid Avenue
Euclid Avenue was added to the National Register of Historic Places in 2005. The 3-mile Bridle Path runs down the center of Euclid Avenue from Foothill Boulevard to 24th Street. The Bridle Path is also used for walking and jogging.

Historic Downtown Upland
The oldest part of Upland is east of Euclid between 8th Street and Arrow Highway, and was originally known as “Old Magnolia”. Historic Downtown Upland,  is a group of downtown merchants who work together to promote and enhance the historic business district. Downtown is made up of nearly 200 businesses providing a diversity of merchandise, restaurants, breweries and services. The Upland Farmers Market is held in downtown Upland every Saturday from April through October.

Government

The dividing line between the two districts mainly follows 14th Street.

Transportation
Upland is home to Cable Airport, the world's largest family-owned, public use, general aviation airport. Nearby Ontario International Airport and more distant Los Angeles International Airport offer commercial flights.

Upland is served by the Metrolink commuter rail system on the San Bernardino Line. Metrolink's San Bernardino Line runs from Los Angeles Union Station to San Bernardino. The line was built in 1887 by the Atchison, Topeka and Santa Fe Railway. AT&SF ceased passenger operations in the late 1960s, but Metrolink acquired the railroad tracks in 1992 and resumed passenger transportation. The Upland Metrolink Station is located at the site of the AT&SF station built in 1937. The 1937 station house is currently used by a retail store, but the rail platform is used for Metrolink operations. The Burlington Northern Santa Fe Railway continues to operate rail freight on the line.

Euclid Avenue is part of California Highway 83, a north–south routh that connects to Ontario and Chino to the south. Foothill Boulevard is part of California Highway 66, an east–west route that was formerly part of U.S. Route 66.

Bus service in Upland is provided by Omnitrans.

Interstate 10 runs along Upland's boundary with Ontario, and connects Upland with Los Angeles to the west and San Bernardino the east. The east–west running State Route 210 (future Interstate 210) runs through the northern part of Upland, connecting to Pasadena to the west and San Bernardino to the east.

Education

Public
Upland is served by the Upland Unified School District. Part of Upland falls within the Chaffey Joint Union High School District, but none of the CJUHSD schools are located in Upland.

Secondary schools
 Upland High School
 Hillside High School (Continuation)

Middle schools
 Pioneer Junior High School
 Upland Junior High School

Elementary schools
 Baldy View Elementary School
 Cabrillo Elementary School
 Citrus Elementary School
 Foothill Knolls Elementary School
 Magnolia Elementary School
 Pepper Tree Elementary School
 Sierra Vista Elementary School
 Sycamore Elementary School
 Upland Elementary School
 Valencia Elementary School

Private
 Carden Arbor View School (K–8)
 Saint Mark's Episcopal School (K–8)
 Upland Christian Academy (K–12)
 Western Christian Schools (PreK–12, multiple campuses)
 St. Joseph Catholic School (K–8)

Notable people

Born here

 Ricky Adams, Major League Baseball infielder
 Kevin Ara, professional soccer player
 Jake Barrett, Major League Baseball pitcher
 Michael Bhatia, social scientist
 Carlos Bocanegra, professional soccer player
 LaVar Christensen, Utah politician
 McKay Christensen, Major League Baseball player
 Melinda Clarke, actress
 Danielle Chuchran, actress
 Chad Cordero, Major League Baseball pitcher
 Lindsay Davis, figure skater
 Brian Dunseth, retired professional soccer player
 Aundrea Fimbres, singer and dancer
 Nikkie Groat, beauty queen contestant
 Big B, rapper
 Jeff Kostoff, Olympic swimmer
 Eddie Lawson, motorcycle racer
 Cory Lekkerkerker, professional football player
 Litefoot, Native American rapper and actor
 Sydnee Michaels, LPGA Tour golfer
 Chad Moeller, Major League Baseball player
 Tiffany Mynx, pornographic actress and film director
 Roger Rueff, playwright
 Joe Ruttman, race-car driver
 Alexis Serna, Canadian Football League player
 Sean Tracey, Major League Baseball pitcher
 Jason Wright, American businessman and football executive

Other residents

 Sandra Lee, American dermatologist
 Alberto Dávila, boxer in World Boxing Hall of Fame; resident of Upland
Fred Herbert, bail bondsman 
 Winds of Plague, deathcore/symphonic metal band
 Red Grammer, musician, Bebop Your Best (2005) Grammy Nominated
 Franklin Bruno, musician
 Tom Jankiewicz, screenwriter of Grosse Pointe Blank
 Nedra Volz, actress
 Roger Fan, actor
 Rollie Fingers, relief pitcher in Baseball Hall of Fame; attended Upland High School
 Edward Ulloa, attorney and former criminal prosecutor
 Corey Miller, tattoo artist and TV personality
 Peter Popoff, televangelist
 Steve Scott, cross-country runner
 Ivan Shaw, actor
 Craig Dietrich, academic and creator of cultural software

Sister cities

  Mildura, Victoria, Australia, which, like Upland, was established as an irrigation community by George and William Chaffey
  Caborca, Sonora, Mexico

In popular culture
Upland is mentioned in the 2008 Keanu Reeves film Street Kings as the home of LAPD Internal Affairs Captain James Biggs (played by Hugh Laurie).

The city is also notable as the location of the TLC TV series Dr. Pimple Popper. The series is a spin-off of the YouTube channel of dermatologist Sandra Lee, who became a major Internet celebrity after posting videos of her procedures. The primary location for both the TV series and YouTube videos is Skin Physicians & Surgeons, a clinic operated by Lee and her dermatologist husband Jeffrey Rebish.

Peter Popoff's People United for Christ is based in Upland.

See also

1990 Upland earthquake
 Upland News, weekly and semiweekly newspaper

References

External links

 
 Upland Chamber of Commerce

 
Cities in San Bernardino County, California
Pomona Valley
Populated places in San Bernardino County, California
Incorporated cities and towns in California
Populated places established in 1906
1906 establishments in California